A Thousand Pieces is a 2018 French drama directed by Véronique Mériadec.

Plot
In 1977, Éric Gaubert murders Olivier, the child of Nicole Parmentier. Twenty-five years later, this broken-hearted mother makes an appointment with the murderer of her son, who has just been released from prison. What is the purpose of this meeting? A simple revenge or the desire to understand what pushed this man to commit the irreparable?

Cast
 Clémentine Célarié : Nicole Parmentier
 Serge Riaboukine : Eric Gaubert
 Juan-Carlos Ruiz : Young Eric Gaubert
 Baptiste Marchais : Olivier
 Lily Meriadec : The little girl

Accolades

Production
Principal photography on the film began in December 2016 in Dreux and lasted only two weeks.

References

External links

2018 films
2018 drama films
French drama films
2010s French-language films
2010s French films